Miguel Ángel Osorio may refer to:

Miguel Ángel Osorio Benítez, Colombian poet and writer better known by his pseudonym, Porfirio Barba-Jacob
Miguel Ángel Osorio Chong, Mexican politician who has served as Governor of Hidalgo